Gordon Noel Upton  (24 December 192023 February 2010) was an Australian public servant and diplomat. He served as Australian High Commissioner to Ceylon (1965–70), Fiji (1976–1979) and India (1979–1984).

While Upton was posted to India, a confidential report that he had authored in October 1980 was leaked to a journalist for The Age, that included criticism of the then Indian Prime Minister Indira Gandhi. The report was confirmed genuine and some members of the Indian parliament called for Upton's expulsion, but the Australian Government's apology satisfied the Indian Government and Upton was allowed to stay.

Upton was made an Officer of the Order of Australia in 1982 in recognition of his services as a diplomat.

Life and career
Upton was born in Sydney, New South Wales, in 1920. He was educated at Canterbury Boys' High School, before matriculating to the University of Sydney where he gained a Bachelor of Arts in 1940.

Upton served in the Royal Australian Air Force during World War II, as a flight lieutenant. In 1946, Upton joined the Commonwealth Public Service in the Department of External Affairs.

While he was Australian embassy counsellor in Jakarta, Upton's dog Susa suffered from rabies and died.

Then Prime Minister Robert Menzies announced Upton's appointment as High Commissioner to Ceylon in December 1965. After a time at the Joint Intelligence Organisation in the early 1970s, Upton returned to the foreign affairs department and was posted to London as Minister in 1973.

In 1975, when Sir Patrick Shaw died in office as Australian Ambassador to the United States, Upton was appointed Chargé d'Affaires ad interim.

In May 1976, Upton was appointed Australian High Commissioner to Fiji.

In December 1979, Andrew Peacock, then foreign affairs minister, announced Upton's appointment as High Commissioner to India. Whilst he was living in New Delhi, details of a confidential report that Upton sent to the Department of Foreign Affairs in October 1980 was published in The Age. The published report included critical remarks about the then Indian Prime Minister, Indira Gandhi, who had been in office for less than a year at the time. After the leak, five members of the Indian Parliament reportedly demanded that Upton be recalled, but the statement was not made on behalf of the Indian Government and Upton retained his position.

Upton, in his position as High Commissioner to India in 1983, presented Mother Teresa with an Order of Australia, for her work with the poor. She was the seventh non-Australian to be honoured with the award.

Upton died on 23 February 2010 and was buried in Woden Cemetery.

Awards
In 1982, Upton was made an Officer of the Order of Australia for his public service as a diplomatic representative.

References

1920 births
2010 deaths
Ambassadors of Australia to Nepal
Ambassadors of Australia to the United States
High Commissioners of Australia to Fiji
High Commissioners of Australia to India
High Commissioners of Australia to Samoa
High Commissioners of Australia to Tonga
University of Sydney alumni
Officers of the Order of Australia